Opostega cirrhacma is a moth of the family Opostegidae. It was described by Edward Meyrick in 1911. It is known from the area of the former Transvaal Province in South Africa.

Adults have been recorded in December.

References

Endemic moths of South Africa
Opostegidae
Moths of Africa
Moths described in 1911